David McHardy (born 21 November 1970) is a New Zealand former cricketer. He played first-class and List A matches for Otago and Wellington between 1991 and 1998.

See also
 List of Otago representative cricketers

References

External links
 

1970 births
Living people
New Zealand cricketers
Otago cricketers
Wellington cricketers
Cricketers from Blenheim, New Zealand